Maharashtra Pradesh Youth Congress (MPYC) is Maharashtra State Unit of Indian Youth Congress.Frontal organisation of the Congress Party, with the objective to fight for social cause and arguing against right-wing parties.
Kunal Nitin Raut is President.

Protests
MPYC protested against the fuel price hike.

References

 
1960 establishments in India 
Youth wings of political parties in India